Lanse is an unincorporated community in Clearfield County, Pennsylvania, United States. Lanse has a post office with ZIP code 16849, which opened on October 1, 1898.

References

Unincorporated communities in Clearfield County, Pennsylvania
Unincorporated communities in Pennsylvania